The 1998 Grand Prix de Tennis de Toulouse was a men's tennis tournament played on indoor hard in Toulouse, France that was part of the International Series of the 1998 ATP Tour. It was the seventeenth edition of the tournament and was held from 28 September – 4 October.

Nicolas Kiefer was the defending champion, but lost in the semifinals to Greg Rusedski.

Jan Siemerink won the title by defeating Greg Rusedski 6–4, 6–4 in the final.

This tournament was notable for being where future 20-time Grand Slam champion and World No. 1 Roger Federer recorded his first match win.

Seeds
Champion seeds are indicated in bold text while text in italics indicates the round in which those seeds were eliminated.

Draw

Finals

Top half

Bottom half

Qualifying

Qualifying seeds
All seeds receive a bye into the second round.

Qualifiers

Lucky losers

Qualifying draw

First qualifier

Second qualifier

Third qualifier

Fourth qualifier

References

External links
 Official results archive (ATP)
 Official results archive (ITF)

Singles
Grand Prix de Tennis de Toulouse